Sittin' on Chrome is the second and final studio album by American hip hop group Masta Ace Incorporated and the third album by Brooklyn-based rapper Masta Ace. It was released on May 2, 1995, through Delicious Vinyl. Recording sessions took place at Firehouse Studios in Brooklyn. Production was handled by Masta Ace under his producer moniker 'Ase One', as well as the Bluez Brothas, Louie "Phat Kat" Vega and Uneek, with Orlando Aguillen serving as executive producer. It peaked at number 69 on the Billboard 200 and number 19 on the Top R&B/Hip-Hop Albums in the United States.

Ace followed the success of his 1994 hits "Jeep Ass Niguh" and "Crooklyn" (released with the Crooklyn Dodgers) with his most commercially successful album, which concentrated more on the West Coast hip hop/gangsta rap sound that particularly became a popular trend among many artists nationwide since the mega-success of Dr. Dre's The Chronic.

Sittin' on Chrome features the crossover hit "Born to Roll" (the West Coast remix of "Jeep Ass Niguh"), which peaked at #23 on the Billboard Hot 100 and was originally released as a hidden track on his SlaughtaHouse album, as well as two more Hot 100 hit singles, "The I.N.C. Ride" and the title track. A year after the release, Ace split with the I.N.C. crew and was largely missing from the hip hop scene, until his comeback album, Disposable Arts, was released in 2001.

Track listing

Personnel
Duval "Masta Ace"/"Ase One" Clear – performer (tracks: 1–7, 9–16), producer (tracks: 3, 5–6, 8–10, 12–15), co-producer (track 4), mixing, remixing (track 2)
Reginald "Lord Digga" Ellis – performer (tracks: 2, 3, 5, 9, 10, 12, 14, 16), producer (tracks: 1, 4, 11), co-producer (track 8), mixing
Leschea A. Boatwright – performer (tracks: 5, 8, 10, 12, 13)
Paula Perry – performer (tracks: 3, 5, 10)
Norman "Witchdoc" Glover – producer (tracks: 1, 4, 11), co-producer (track 8)
Louis "Phat Kat" Vega – producer (tracks: 2, 16)
Sean "Uneek" McFadden – producer (track 7)
Orlando Aguillen – executive producer
Blaise Dupuy – recording
Ethan Ryman – recording
Frantz Verna – recording
James Mansfield – mixing
Brian "Big Bass" Gardner – mastering
Tony Dawsey – mastering
Truly Rain – art direction
Studio S.E.E. – design
Brian "B+" Cross – photography
Donavin "Kid Styles" Murray – illustration
Jonathan Pollack – management

Charts

Singles chart positions

References

External links

1995 albums
Masta Ace albums
Delicious Vinyl albums